The statue of Mikuláš Karlach is installed at Vyšehrad, Prague, Czech Republic.

External links

 

Outdoor sculptures in Prague
Sculptures of men in Prague
Statues in Prague